Bloom County is an American comic strip by Berkeley Breathed which originally ran from December 8, 1980, until August 6, 1989.  It examined events in politics and culture through the viewpoint of a fanciful small town in Middle America, where children often have adult personalities and vocabularies and where animals can talk.

On July 12, 2015, Breathed started drawing Bloom County again. The first revived strip was published via Facebook on July 13, 2015.

Publication history and production

Bloom County originated from a comic strip known as The Academia Waltz, which Breathed produced for The Daily Texan, the student newspaper of the University of Texas. The comic strip attracted the notice of the editors of The Washington Post, who recruited him to do a nationally syndicated strip. On December 8, 1980, Bloom County, syndicated by The Washington Post Writers Group, made its debut and featured some of the characters from Academia Waltz, including former frat-boy Steve Dallas and the paraplegic Vietnam war veteran Cutter John.

Breathed set Bloom County in a small town. Breathed said he made the choice because he had followed a girlfriend to Iowa City, Iowa; Breathed commented, "You draw—literally—from your life if you’re going to write anything with some juice to it. I did just that."

Breathed's hand-printed signature on his strips was usually presented in mirror image, i.e. right to left.

Breathed was awarded the Pulitzer Prize in editorial cartooning in 1987 for Bloom County. Because the cartoon appeared on the comics page, and not on the editorial page, the win was disapproved of by many members of Association of American Editorial Cartoonists.

Breathed cited the controversy over the release of Go Set a Watchman as the factor that led him to resume Bloom County.

Characters

Core characters

At the very beginning of the strip (December 1980), the central setting was the Bloom boarding house run by the grandparents of Milo Bloom.  As the strip continued, various boarders (and/or pets) moved into the boarding house.  In the order the characters debuted:

Milo Bloom, introduced in December 1980, is a 10-year-old newspaper reporter and probably the most worldly-wise of the bunch.  Milo was the original protagonist of Bloom County, and much of the strip's action during its first year takes place at the boarding house owned by his family. Initially presented as an innocent-yet-precocious ten-year-old grappling bizarrely with the hallmarks of his impending puberty (to the extent of developing an intense infatuation with Betty Crocker), Milo's 'offscreen' appointment to a journalist position for the local Bloom Beacon newspaper in January 1982 gradually modified his role to that of a 'straight man', with a number of his more absurdist earlier traits re-allocated to then-ascendant protagonist Opus. In the very earliest strips, Milo's grandfather ("The Major") was a central character; after the first year, the Major's role diminished and he eventually ceased to appear as a regular at the end of 1982, vanishing altogether after his final appearance in a July 1983 Sunday strip. 
Steve Dallas, introduced in May 1981, was (like Cutter John) originally a featured character in The Academia Waltz.  Steve is Bloom County's sole defense attorney.  A machoistic and irresponsible chain smoker and former "frat boy", Dallas spends most of his free time either trying to seduce women or concocting get-rich-quick schemes, including forming and managing a heavy metal band, Billy and the Boingers (previously known as Deathtöngue). While initially introduced as a foil to Bobbi Harlow, the latter's eventual hookup with Cutter John increasingly expanded the flexibility of Dallas's role, rendering him the strip's sole major adult human character by the mid-80s. 
Michael Binkley was also introduced in May 1981.  Binkley was a schoolmate of Milo's who lived with his father, Tom Binkley, rather than in the boarding house. Binkley is wishy-washy and overly reflective (in the mold of Charlie Brown), when not contemplating the lives of famous figures in pop culture, often at his father's bedside in the middle of the night.  His "anxiety closet", first appearing in January 1983, has been a staple of many storylines.
Opus is a large-nosed penguin (occasionally mistaken for a puffin) with a herring addiction who lost track of his mother during the Falklands War (they were later reunited in a closing storyline at the end of the strip's first incarnation). He was originally introduced as the more realistically designed pet penguin of Michael Binkley ("A boy and his penguin!" "A penguin and his boy!") in June 1981, although he was only seen in three strips that month.  He was re-introduced as a full-time cast member in January 1982; by mid-1982, Opus had ceased to be Binkley's pet and he eventually became a boarder at the Bloom house, with his design likewise evolving into its more stylized trademark form (thus identifying him less strongly as a penguin) by the end of 1983. Opus' hopeless naïveté and optimism made him a fan favorite, and he quickly became the center of the strip, as well as the subject of two "sequel" strips (Outland and Opus), three children's books, and a television special entitled A Wish for Wings That Work.
Cutter John, introduced in November 1981, is a wheelchair-using Vietnam veteran, noted for indulging in Star Trek fantasies with the meadow animals (Hodge-Podge, Portnoy and Opus), as well as anti-war protests. He is not a womanizer like Steve Dallas, but he is more popular with the ladies. His visage is nearly identical to that of Breathed himself. The character had previously appeared in Breathed's earlier comic strip, The Academia Waltz, where he had been known as 'Saigon John'.
Bill the Cat is a filthy, scraggly, flea-bitten, orange tabby cat, introduced in June 1982 as a parody of the comic character Garfield. The humor of the character was the antithesis of Garfield: whereas the famous fat-cat was a marketing bonanza, Bloom County humorously tried desperately to present Bill in the same manner, despite his disgusting and unappealing appearance. After serving over a year as a relatively minor character largely existing 'outside' of the strip's main continuity and cast of characters (beyond sporadic appearances and background references to his merchandise), Breathed temporarily retired the character via alluding to his 'offscreen' death in September 1983 (allegedly from acne); following his resurrection in July of the following year, Bill rapidly increased in prominence to the point of assuming an ironically central role in numerous major storylines, thus solidifying him as one of the strip's most widely-known figures (alongside Opus). Following his resurrection, Bill's low intelligence and inability to articulate himself beyond his trademark responses, "Ack" and "Pbthhh" led to him becoming something of a blank slate around which various increasingly-absurd plots revolved. He has been a cult member ("Bhagwan Bill"), televangelist ("Fundamentally Oral Bill"), perennial Presidential candidate (for the National Radical Meadow Party), heavy metal rock star ("Wild Bill Catt"), nuclear power plant operator at Chernobyl, and, in the last months of the series, had his brain surgically replaced with Donald Trump's, alongside allegedly conducting affairs with Jeane Kirkpatrick, Princess Diana and Socks the cat. He has been known to speak on occasion, most notably during the Communist witch-hunt trials of which he has been a subject, when he remarked, "Say, you don't suppose the 'Jury Box' is anything like a litter box, do you?". Numerous strips indicated that his persistent near-catatonic state was the result of drug use or brain damage resulting from once being legally dead and then revived after too long a period. In the Christmas special A Wish for Wings That Work, implicitly set in a differing continuity from the strip, Opus alternately recounts having rescued Bill from a university science lab where they had replaced his brains with Tater Tots.
 is a rabbit (name unknown until April 1984) who is best friends with Portnoy and Cutter John.  He is politically conservative and fanatical about various issues, despite the fact that he is extremely ignorant about those same issues. Both Hodge-Podge and Portnoy (below) started off in April 1982 as unnamed minor characters, and their roles gradually increased as the strip continued, coalescing into their final forms around 1984.
Portnoy is a groundhog, although his species was a mystery until October 1983. Before the revelation that he was a groundhog, he was portrayed as a squirrel, gopher, porcupine and possum, with his finalized groundhog design first emerging in March 1983. Portnoy was the grouchiest and most bigoted character by far and (in a few strips) was a bully to Opus.
Oliver Wendell Jones is a schoolmate of Milo and Binkley, introduced in September 1983.  He is a young computer hacker and gifted scientist. He once tried to bring an end to the Cold War by introducing onto the front page of Pravda the headline, "Gorbachev Urges Disarmament: Total! Unilateral!", but faulty translation caused the headline to read, "Gorbachev Sings Tractors: Turnip! Buttocks!" He has a fairly extensive criminal record as a result of his numerous computer pranks.  Oliver is African-American.  His mother has dressed her son to resemble Michael Jackson, much to Oliver's chagrin.

Other characters

Bobbi Harlow is the feminist schoolteacher of Milo and Binkley and the love interest of both Steve and Cutter. She was a major character from her introduction in April 1981 until mid-1982, in which her role largely dissipates into that of Cutter John's sporadically appearing girlfriend, thus catalyzing her eventual disappearance by July 1983. She appears only once in the strip's later years, when Opus learns she has joined the crew of The Phil Donahue Show.  In August 1981, her parents visited, and met Steve, whom they disliked.
Quiche Lorraine, cousin of Bobbi Harlow and one-time girlfriend of Steve Dallas circa 1982.  She was only dating Steve because of his body and dumped him after an accident left him in a full-body cast.
Cozy Fillerup, single mother and love interest to Cutter John. She was introduced in the 2015 revival of the strip when Cutter John and crew ran over her with his wheelchair, the "Aluminium Falcon".
Abby Fillerup, Cozy's sole daughter. She was introduced in the 2015 revival of the strip. She practices yoga, acupuncture, and other New Age beliefs. As her introduction is quite recent, her importance and involvement with the future of the strip is unknown. She has been seen to participate in the gang's pop culture fantasies, and is often seen engaging in antics with the main cast.
Tom Binkley, Binkley's father, usually distraught over his son's behavior, his own divorce or mid-life crisis.
Frank Jones, Oliver's father, who funds his son's scientific endeavors, particularly his cure for baldness made from cat-sweat nicknamed "Scalp Tonic".
Eleanor Jones, Oliver's mother, distrustful of technology and science, usually with good reason.
Lola Granola, a free-spirited and gentle hippie who experiments with green politics and vegetarianism. She and Opus had a long engagement, but were married only seconds before Opus was knocked unconscious while clumsily trying to kiss her and had a nightmare of his future which caused him to annul the marriage the instant he woke up.
Milquetoast the Cockroach: an eloquent yet disgusting cockroach living in the boarding house, he secretly uses subliminal messaging (usually in the form of whispering in the tenants' ears as they sleep) to convince them to spare his life and bring him food.
Rosebud the Basselope, a basset hound with antlers (in a play on jackalope). As the last basselope on Earth (the second-to-last having been hunted and killed for sport by Donald Trump), Rosebud is somewhat gullible, naive, and easily shocked. Long after her introduction, it was determined that Rosebud was actually female, in a parody of the use of female dogs to portray the ostensibly male canine beer mascot Spuds McKenzie. The rebooted Bloom County gave her the ability to fly when her antlers were inflated with "dandelion gas".
Ronald-Ann Smith is a young, innocent African-American girl from "the wrong side of the tracks" who lives in poverty. Her frequent efforts to make the best of the little she has often make the rest of the cast feel selfish and uncomfortable. Her best friend is Reynalda, a headless doll. At the end of the first series of Bloom County, she shows Opus the way to Outland, presented as a magical imaginary world she created to escape her harsh reality.
 The Banana Jr. 6000 Computer (a blatant parody of the Apple Macintosh) is presented as an almost robot-like companion of Oliver, though he is quick to dispose of it if a newer model has even the slightest superficial upgrade.

Notable storylines
For detailed summaries of all storylines, see the entries for the individual books.
 Opus was originally intended to have a run of just two weeks, but his status was cemented with a memorable Sunday strip involving a Hare Krishna asking for money. Opus continued to misunderstand the Krishna's request for money before finally misinterpreting "Prayer temples for Hare Krishnas" as "Pear pimples for hairy fishnuts!" Breathed wrote in one of the Bloom County books that the reaction was so overwhelmingly strong he made Opus a permanent member of the cast.
In 1984 the American Meadow Party ran Bill the Cat as its presidential candidate opposing Ronald Reagan and Walter Mondale, with Opus as the vice presidential candidate. Their campaign slogan was, "This Time, Why Not The Worst?"  The sequence parodied the entire campaign season and the lengths some parties would go to, with Opus becoming near suicidal when told he is running behind pickled prunes in popularity polls. It did lead to the slogan of disaffected voters everywhere, "Don't blame me. I voted for Bill and Opus." 
 Steve forms a heavy metal band with Opus, Hodge Podge, and Bill, initially called "Deathtöngue". Steve is forced to rename the band "Billy and the Boingers" after he is brought before a congressional hearing investigating the effect of heavy metal music on youth, similar to the Parents Music Resource Center.
 Opus decides to reunite with his long-lost mother for Christmas in Antarctica, only to discover that his mother supposedly died saving soldiers in the Falklands war.  Her gravestone reads, 'The Falklands Martyr: She Loved her Boy'. She is later revealed to be alive.
 The cast of Bloom County goes on strike.  W. A. Thornhump refuses to concede to any of their demands and attempts to have his office staff fill in.  Things get ugly when Steve Dallas crosses the picket line and Thornhump hires strike-breakers to play Opus, Bill, and Oliver.  In the end, the strikers are defeated, although Opus still throws eggs at Steve, saying "Here comes breakfast from Aunt Opus!!"
Oliver invents Dr. Oliver's Scalp Tonic using Bill the Cat's perspiration motivated from the thought of Dan Quayle becoming US president.  The tonic miraculously will restore hair on anyone, but has the side effect of users producing "ack" noises.  The US government bans it, but the gang decide to continue producing it illegally after discovering that desperate customers are willing to buy it at exorbitant prices. In a parody of the war on drugs, the gang is extremely successful while thwarting the ineffectual government attempts to stop the illegal trade. As violent crime arises from the trade, the tonic operation is fatally undermined when the government legalizes it. The effects are later to be shown as temporary, leaving Oliver's father totally bald.
Oliver learns of the Apartheid system in South Africa. He invents a "pigmentizer", which will temporarily turn a white person black. Cutter John and Opus are dispatched to Washington to zap the South African ambassador, but their balloon-powered wheelchair crashes into the Atlantic Ocean and they disappear. Though officially listed as "Eaten By Squid", Opus reappears some time later, suffering from such strong amnesia that he initially has no idea he is even a penguin. Eventually the fake news of a secret wedding between Eddie Murphy and Diane Sawyer, Opus' longtime crush, shocks him into recalling what happened. After drifting for a while between lost islands, using the wheelchair as a raft, Cutter John and Opus were rescued by a Soviet submarine and arrested as spies. In order to rescue him, Steve Dallas meets with Russian envoys to trade Cutter John in for the one thing they want from Bloom County: Bill the Cat.
Donald Trump is accidentally and fatally injured by the anchor of his own yacht. Incredibly, surgeons turn to Bill the Cat as a donor body in which to insert Trump's still-living brain. Trapped in Bill's body, Trump finds himself disinherited from his financial empire and estranged from his wife Ivana. With nowhere else to turn, he takes Bill's place in the Bloom County boarding house, making unsuccessful attempts to start from scratch and occasionally being given equally unsuccessful lessons on the value of life by Opus. This eventually culminates in Trump regaining power and using it to buy out Bloom County, firing the entire staff of characters in the process.

End and spinoff strips
Breathed decided to end the strip in 1989. In keeping with the continuity of the Bill the Cat/Donald Trump storyline, Trump "buys out" the comic strip and fires all of the cast. In the strip's final weeks the cast found new "jobs" with other comic strips. A "goodbye party" was held over the course of the week where characters talked about joining new strips. Portnoy and Hodge Podge get jobs as janitors behind the scenes at Marmaduke; Steve Dallas joins the cast of Cathy and attempts to pitch himself as a new superhero, but is quickly fired from both jobs; Michael Binkley becomes a wild boar skinner for Prince Valiant. Lola Granola says that she has been invited to pose for Playboy, which Opus dislikes. Milo Bloom is seen with a snake swallowing him head first and informing Opus he would be appearing Tuesdays in The Far Side. Oliver Wendell Jones is seen with the distinct features of Family Circus characters. He informs Opus he is being "bussed in" to the strip as part of a court order. Once Bloom County characters are scattered, only Opus is left as part of a plot to transition to Breathed's next strip in Bloom County'''s final week.

Shortly after Bloom County ended, Breathed started a Sunday-only strip called Outland with original characters and situations introduced in Bloom Countys final days. However, Opus, Bill and other characters eventually reappeared and slowly took over the strip. Outland ran from September 3, 1989, to March 26, 1995. Another Sunday-only spinoff strip called Opus ran from November 23, 2003, to November 2, 2008.

Return
On July 12, 2015, Breathed posted to his Facebook page a photo with the caption "A return after 25 years. Feels like going home." The photo showed him drawing a comic strip with the title Bloom County 2015 with Opus pictured in the first frame. A fan asked in the comments on the picture if this was in response to Donald Trump's presidential campaign, and Mr. Breathed responded to the comment that "This creator can't precisely deny that the chap you mention had nothing to do with it." The next day, July 13, 2015, the first comic of the revived strip was officially posted online, also to Breathed's Facebook page. The strip was relaunched under the Bloom County 2015 title, only to be renamed simply as Bloom County at the start of 2016.

On the return of the strips Breathed stated:
 Breathed originally had no plans of publishing the new strips outside of his Facebook page, commenting that “Newspapers need deadlines, alas. Like my departed friend Douglas Adams used to say, the only part of deadlines I enjoyed was the whooshing sound as they sped by.” An archive of the new strips has started at GoComics since then.  A new book was announced in June 2016; Bloom County Episode XI: A New Hope was a compilation of strips from 2015 and 2016. Two more books followed in 2017 and 2018, respectively. No more books have been published since.

On April 11, 2022, Breathed posted a new strip on Facebook labeled "Season 33, Episode 3" in the title panel. It featured Steve Dallas and Opus in a satire of the MeToo Movement.

 Incorporating Calvin and Hobbes 
Starting from 2016, Breathed took on, with permission, the characters from Calvin and Hobbes in an occasional series of strips.

Influence
Bloom County has had an influence on other cartoonists, particularly cartoonists who have an irreverent bent or tackle political topics in their work.

For example, Scott Kurtz, creator of the webcomic PvP, acknowledged Breathed's contributions at one point with a strip expressing the opinion that "so many webcomics. ..are nothing but Bloom County ripoffs", then lampooning itself by mimicking Breathed's art and dialogue style in the final panel.

Aaron McGruder, creator of the comic and later animated series The Boondocks, has paid tribute to Breathed's work as well, with a few aspects of the strip bearing more than a passing resemblance to important Bloom County features (including at least a couple of artistic similarities), and an episode of the animated series wherein the character Uncle Ruckus calls Breathed "Master Penguin Draw'er".

The series was adapted into the 1991 animated Christmas special entitled A Wish for Wings That Work, which is now available on DVD.

Bloom County location 
The fictional setting of Bloom County served as a recurring backdrop for the comic and its sequels, although the nature of the setting was frequently altered.

In the comics, the county is presented as a stereotypical American midwestern small town. The small town setting was frequently contrasted with the increasing globalization taking place in the rest of the world; though Bloom County contained the likes of farmers and wilderness creatures by default, it was frequented by Hare Krishnas, feminists, and rock stars.

While the location of Bloom County is never explicitly mentioned, there have been some clues in the strip. When Oliver Jones identified Bloom County as the place where Halley's Comet would crash into Earth, a sign was seen saying that it was at 35.05 N  146.55 E. This would place it in the Pacific Ocean, about 300 miles off the coast of Japan. Oliver's previous calculation was 39.43 N  105.01 W, which would place it just south of Denver, Colorado. In an early strip, Milo gives his address as "Box 163, Bloom County, N.I., 12460", the zip code for which would place it about 30 miles southwest of Albany, New York.  Another strip has Opus trying to make airline reservations to Des Moines, Iowa.  He balks at the outrageously high quoted price for a ticket stating that "Des Moines is just 94 miles from Bloom County".  Geographically, this would place Bloom County in either Iowa or the far north-central tier of counties of Missouri, but likely referring to the distance from Iowa City, where the strip was produced, to Des Moines. (See Real World References below). Also, in a Sunday strip with L.H. Puttgrass, he is holding a King Soopers bag, which would place the comic in Colorado.  On January 29, 2016, Berkeley Breathed posted on Facebook that "The Bloom County boarding house still sits in beautiful hayseedless Iowa City, home for this cartoonist for four years."

The county was home to the Bloom Boarding House, Steve Dallas' law offices, the Bloom Beacon and Bloom Picayune newspapers, at least one pond, and Milo's Meadow. In the comic's later years, the county contained what appeared to be a big-city ghetto ("the wrong side of the tracks", as it was known).

The geographical profile of the county was fluid as the artistic style of the strip evolved. During most of Bloom County'''s run, the rural meadow setting was presented realistically, while in its later years it became increasingly more abstract.

The Outland setting of the strip was originally set apart from the county by way of a magical doorway. By Outland's end, the Outland appeared to be a part of Bloom County itself.

The final Outland strip listed the characters as living at "555 Hairybutt St., Bloom County, Outland".Opus also takes place in Bloom County.

Real-world references

Breathed lived in Iowa City, Iowa during the early years of the strip, and the setting of Bloom County resembles Iowa City in several ways. The Bloom Boarding House, which appeared as a high contrast photo within the strip, is modeled after the Linsay House located at 935 East College Street. Another Iowa City landmark, The Prairie Lights Bookstore, was referred to in the strip as the "Prairie Lights Newsstand"; original Bloom County artwork from Breathed now hangs in the bookstore. Another original Bloom County strip hangs in the Iowa City Public Library. Breathed used the call letters KRNA to refer to Bloom Countys rock radio station featuring "Rockin' Charmin' Harmin". The call letters belong to an actual Iowa City rock station which featured a disc jockey named "Charmin'" Jeff Harmon in the 1980s. Several Iowa City local news items also directly inspired Bloom County storylines. For example, a fictional Ronald Reagan sexist gaffe, referring to women as "little dumplin's", was lifted from University of Iowa football coach Hayden Fry's comment, infuriating feminists at the university.

Animated series 
In February 2022 it was announced that Bill the Cat, Opus, and the rest of Berkeley Breathed's "Bloom County" universe are set to make their debut on Fox. “Bloom County” will be co-written and executive produced by Breathed. Bento Box will serve as the animation studio on the project. Fox's animation company, Bento Box Entertainment, Miramax, Spyglass Media Group and Project X Entertainment are all working on it as an animated series. In September 2022, it was announced The Simpsons writer Tim Long joined the series as showrunner.

Bloom County books
Like many other popular comic strips, Bloom County has been republished in various collections. By 2004, the comic strip was reprinted in 11 books, the first having been published in 1983 and the last in that year. None of the reprints contained complete runs of the strip, although Bloom County Babylon contained many of the strips that preceded Loose Tails.  All of the daily strips have been reprinted in Comics Revue magazine.

IDW Publishing published The Bloom County Library, a five volume hardback collection of all Bloom County strips, beginning in October 2009.  This series is part of their Library of American Comics series.  It is a complete reprint of the strip, including side notes about cultural and political references made in the strip, "Headlines" breaks to identify the top stories of the day, and commentary from Breathed. Each volume has three separate releases: a standard edition, a signed edition, and a signed, remarked edition. Breathed said that the reason why the strips printed in The Bloom County Library were not published in previous collections was that the publisher would not let Breathed publish 400 pages each year, so Breathed had to reduce the content in each book. Breathed also said that he believes that, "I just closed my eyes and dropped a dart on the ones to be included." He felt relieved the publishers did not "have to ask ... to do this again."

On October 25, 2017, IDW published Bloom County: Real, Classy, & Compleat: 1980-1989, collecting the complete run of Bloom County in two volumes. An "Ultimate Collectors Set" was also released, including the original art from a daily strip featuring Opus, a page from Breathed's sketchbooks, and a personalized sketch of Opus on the slipcover.

Collections
 Loose Tails (1983)
 Toons for Our Times (1984)
 Penguin Dreams and Stranger Things (1985)
 Bloom County Babylon: Five Years of Basic Naughtiness (1986)—An omnibus featuring strips from the previous three collections
 Billy and the Boingers Bootleg (1987)
 Tales Too Ticklish to Tell (1988)
 The Night of the Mary Kay Commandos (1989)
 Happy Trails! (1990)
 Classics of Western Literature (1990)—An omnibus featuring strips from the previous four collections
 One Last Little Peek, 1980–1995: The Final Strips, the Special Hits, the Inside Tips (1995) - A collection of strips from both Bloom County and Outland
 Opus: 25 Years of His Sunday Best (2004)—An omnibus featuring strips from Bloom County, Outland, and Opus
 Bloom County Episode XI: A New Hope (2016)
 Bloom County: The Real, Classy, & Compleat 1980–1989 (2017)
 Bloom County Brand Spanking New Day (2017)
 Bloom County Best Read on the Throne (2018)

The Complete Bloom County Library

Bloom County: The Complete Library, published by The Library of American Comics, an imprint of IDW Publishing, between 2009 and 2012. Collects the complete Bloom County as well as Outland and Opus.

References

External links
Berkeley Breathed's website
Bloom County at Don Markstein's Toonopedia. Archived from the original on February 22, 2018.
Breathed interview in The A.V. Club, August 15, 2001

 
American comic strips
1980 comics debuts
1989 comics endings
Comics about politics
Fictional counties
Comic strips set in the United States
Fictional locations in comics
Comics about penguins
Comics about cats
Comics about pigs
Comics about animals
Comics about rabbits and hares
Works by Berkeley Breathed